Khelaghor is an 2020 Indian Bengali language Romantic Thriller Drama television series that premiered on 30 November 2020 on Bengali General Television Entertainment Channel Star Jalsha and it also available on the digital platform Disney+ Hotstar. The show is produced by Snehasish Chakraborty of Blues Productions and stars Swikriti Majumder and Syed Arefin in lead roles. On 8 August 2022, an Odia dubbed version of this show was premiered on Star Kiran. After a successful run of almost two years, the show went off-air on 4 September 2022.

Plot
The story involves a rich girl Purna Chatterjee who gets accidentally married to an uneducated vagabond Shantu Gunda, a goon living in a slum in a twist of fate. 
Shantu, once a bright student Digbijoy Roy, gets jailed for 3 years for a crime he committed accidentally and later gets hired by Gogon Makhal, the leader of a local political party. Purna is the daughter of Justice Barun Chatterjee, the judge responsible for Shantu's imprisonment. Born and brought up conservatively, she never thought of meeting a man and falling in love with him, thus agreeing for an arranged marriage with Ritam. Shantu, on the other hand applies sindoor on Purna's forehead in a fit of rage just to prove his point about marriage, but he later regrets it. Though shocked and distraught at first, Purna leaves Ritam on the very ritual whereas Ritam supports Purna and says he loves her irrespective of the accidental sindur which is not really a marriage by law. But Purna forcefully enters in the slum as a newly wed bride, much to the chagrin of her father as well as Shantu. Ritam continues to love her but Purna ignores him and keeps chasing Shantu, who is also loved secretly by his childhood friend Radha. However, destiny makes many events occur in the life of Shantu and Purna which eventually make them both gets close to each other.

Cast

Main
 Swikriti Majumder as Purna Roy, Digbijoy a.k.a. Shantu's wife
 Syed Arefin as Digbijoy Roy a.k.a. Shantu gunda, Purna's husband

Recurring
 Sohan Bandyopadhyay as Justice Barun Chatterjee, Purna and Arna's Father, Somdatta's Husband
 Dolon Roy as Somdatta Chatterjee, Purna and Arna's Mother, Barun's wife
 Shuvangshee Dutta as Arna Chatterjee, Purna's sister
 Subhasish Mukherjee as Sarbojit Roy, Ranjit, Ajit and Shantu's Father
 Mousumi Saha as Panchali Roy, Ranjit, Ajit and Shantu's Mother
 Jayanta Dutta Barman as Ranjit Roy, Shantu's elder brother
 Bulbuli Panja as Swati Roy, Ranjit's wife
 Sounak Ray as Ritam Mukherjee, Purna's ex-fiancé; an IPS
 Manishankar Banerjee as Partha Pratim Mukherjee, Ritam's father
 Biplab Bandyopadhyay(older) as Shantu's professor
 Sneha Das as Radha, Shantu's childhood friend and lover; Ravi's love interest
 Tapasi Roy Chowdhury as Kiranmala Ganguly, Purna's elder paternal aunt, Barun's elder sister
 Sudipa Basu as Aloka Chatterjee, Barun's elder sister-in-law
 Rana Mitra as Tarun Chatterjee, Barun's younger brother
 Meghna Halder as Meghna Chatterjee, Tarun's wife
 Dipanjan Jack Bhattacharya as Rana Chatterjee, Purna's elder brother
 Mousumi Bhattacharya as Bonnie Chatterjee, Rana's wife
 Sukanya Chatterjee as Baishali, Purna's eldest cousin
 Ankita Brahma as Riya, Purna's cousin
 Nondini Roy as Nondini, Purna's cousin
 Gargi Mukherjee as Gargi, Purna's youngest cousin
 Sankar Sanku Chakraborty as Gogon Makhal- a corrupt politician, Purna and Shantu's rival
 Surajit Sen as Bobin goon, Shantu's Rival
 Priyantika Karmakar as Gauri Makhal- Gogon's sister
Judhajit Banerjee as Badal Singh

Adaptation

Reception

Ratings

References

Bengali-language television programming in India
2020 Indian television series debuts
Star Jalsha original programming
Indian drama television series
2022 Indian television series endings